Zik Zak Filmworks is an Icelandic film production company based in Reykjavík. The company was founded in 1995 by Skúli Fr. Malmquist and Thorir S. Sigurjonsson. It produces feature films, documentaries, and shorts.

Filmography
 Last and First Men (2020)
 Óskin
 Pabbahelgar
 The Professor and the Madman
 To Plant a Flag
 And Breathe Normally
 I Remember You
 Búi
 Cubs
 The Together Project
 Z for Zachariah
 Paris of the North
 Harry & Heimir: First time Is Murder
 Megaphone 16 years til summer
 Black's Game
 Babybird, Unborn
 Volcano
 Gauragangur
 Undercurrent
 The Good Heart
 Electronica Reykjavik
 Skrapp út
 Misty Mountain
 Thanks
 Skröltormar
 The Boss of It All
 The Last Winter
 Dark Horse
 Screaming Masterpiece
 The Last Farm
 Niceland (Population. 1.000.002)
 Silny Kafe
 Jargo
 Noi the Albino
 Gemsar
 Dramarama
 Fíaskó

See also
 Antidote Films
 Glass Eye Pix
 Dagur Kári
 Friðrik Þór Friðriksson
 Sólveig Anspach

References

External links
 
 Zik Zak's Skúli Explains How Their Film-works
  BFI/ Zik Zak FIlmworks
  Zik Zak Filmworks' Z for Zachariah Makes the Annual "Black List"

Film production companies of Iceland
Mass media in Reykjavík